The Coppa Europa (European Cup) U.S.I.P Trophy is an international club figure skating competition held annually in Italy. It is typically the final event of the European Criterium.

Basic Novice Medalists

Girls

Ladies

Boys

Chicks Medalists

Girls

Boys

Cubs Medalists

Girls

Boys

Advanced Novice Medalists

Girls

Junior Medalists

Ladies

References

External links
European Criterium Official Website

Figure skating competitions